Latrobe Council is a local government body in Tasmania, situated in the north of the state, east of Devonport. The Latrobe local government area is classified as rural and has a population of 11,329, it encompasses the principal town, Latrobe, and the nearby localities including Port Sorell, Sassafras and Wesley Vale.

History and attributes
The Latrobe municipality was established on 1 January 1907. Latrobe is classified as rural, agricultural and very large under the Australian Classification of Local Governments.

Suburbs

Not in above list
 Beaconsfield
 Frankford
 Holwell
 Parkham
 York Town

See also
List of local government areas of Tasmania

References

External links
Latrobe Council official website
Local Government Association Tasmania
Tasmanian Electoral Commission - local government

 
Local government areas of Tasmania